London—Middlesex (also known as Middlesex East riding) was a federal electoral district that was represented in the House of Commons of Canada from 1979 to 1997. It was located in the province of Ontario.

Middlesex East riding was created in 1976 from parts of Huron—Middlesex, London East and Middlesex—London—Lambton ridings. It initially consisted of the Townships of Biddulph, London, North Dorchester, Westminster and West Nissouri (excluding the Village of Belmont) and the southeast part of the City of London.

The name of the electoral district was changed in 1977 to "London-Middlesex".

In 1987, the Village of Belmont and the Village of Lucan were added. The City of London portion of the riding was redefined.

The electoral district was abolished in 1996 when it was redistributed between Elgin—Middlesex—London, London West, London—Adelaide, London—Fanshawe and Perth—Middlesex ridings.

Members of Parliament

This riding has elected the following Members of Parliament:

Electoral history

|}

|}

|}

|}

Parliamentary website:Middlesex East
Parliamentary website: London-Middlesex

See also 

 List of Canadian federal electoral districts
 Past Canadian electoral districts

External links 

 Website of the Parliament of Canada

Former federal electoral districts of Ontario